Las Mujeres Perdidas is the third volume of the American comics series Love and Rockets by the Hernandez brothers, Gilbert and Jaime, and published in 1987.

The cover of the compilation is by Jaime Hernandez, the back cover by Gilbert. Gilbert and Jaime's brother, Mario Hernandez, does not participate to this book.

Contents 
These stories are dated 1983–1987. Unlike in the first two volumes, there are no more monsters and extra-terrestrials and science-fiction disappears almost completely.

Chronology
Previous album: Chelo's Burden <-> Next album: Tears from Heaven.

Comics publications
Fantagraphics titles
1987 graphic novels